Wondabyne is a suburb located in the Central Coast region of New South Wales, Australia, and is part of the  local government area. The river that surrounds Wondabyne is called "Mullet Creek".

Wondabyne Railway Station does not have road access, making the train station the only one in Australia to not have road access.

The station and shacks and houses on Mullet Creek starred in the film "The Oyster Farmer".

References

External links
Video of Wondabyne station precinct.. Retrieved 6 March 2015.
History of Wondabyne.. Retrieved 6 March 2015.

Suburbs of the Central Coast (New South Wales)
Towns in New South Wales